Michael Kelly (born 1979) is an Irish newspaper editor. He is editor of the weekly newspaper The Irish Catholic and a columnist with the Irish Independent.

Kelly is from Omagh, County Tyrone, and attended St Patrick's High school, Omagh and later St Patrick's College, Maynooth, where he studied for a post-graduate degree in theology. He worked as a producer and redactor for Vatican Radio in Rome, and served as Rome correspondent for The Irish Catholic.  He returned to Ireland in 2005. He was appointed deputy editor of The Irish Catholic in 2007.

In October 2012, aged 33, he was appointed editor of The Irish Catholic, succeeding Garry O'Sullivan. He regularly appears as a guest contributor on TV and radio on religious topics. He has appeared on the BBC, UTV, CNN and Al Jazeera. He has made contributions to the American publications National Catholic Reporter, Our Sunday Visitor and The Catholic World Report the UK's Catholic Herald as well as Irish newspapers including the Irish Independent, Irish Examiner and The Irish News.

Publications
 How to Defend the Faith Without Raising Your Voice by Michael Kelly and Austen Ivereigh, Columba Press (2018).

References

1970s births
Living people
People from County Tyrone
Roman Catholics from Northern Ireland
Irish journalists
Irish newspaper editors
Alumni of St Patrick's College, Maynooth
People educated at St Patrick's Grammar School, Armagh